is a reunion single by the Japanese idol girl group Onyanko Club. It was released in Japan on November 20, 2002.

Track listing

Charts

Weekly charts

References 

Onyanko Club songs
2002 songs
2002 singles
Songs with lyrics by Yasushi Akimoto
Pony Canyon singles